Whey is the liquid remaining after milk has been curdled and strained. It is a byproduct of the manufacturing of cheese or casein and has several commercial uses. Sweet whey is a byproduct resulting from the manufacture of rennet types of hard cheese, like cheddar or Swiss cheese. Acid whey (also known as sour whey) is a byproduct brought out during the making of acid types of dairy products, such as strained yogurt.

Whey proteins consist of α-lactalbumin, β-lactoglobulin, serum albumin, immunoglobulins, and proteose peptones.

Composition 
Whey protein is the collection of globular proteins isolated from whey. The protein in cow's milk is 20% whey protein and 80% casein protein, whereas the protein in human milk is 60% whey and 40% casein. The protein fraction in whey constitutes approximately 10% of the total dry solids in whey. This protein is typically a mixture of beta-lactoglobulin (~48-58%), alpha-lactalbumin (~13-19%), bovine serum albumin (~6%)(see also serum albumin), and immunoglobulins. These are soluble in their native forms, independent of pH.

The amino acid cysteine in whey protein is a substrate for the synthesis of glutathione in the body which is a ubiquitous cellular antioxidant; laboratory experiments have suggested that whey protein and its components might reduce the risk of cancer in animals, suggesting an avenue for future medical research.

Production 
To produce cheese, rennet or an edible acid is added to heated milk. This makes the milk coagulate or curdle, separating the milk solids (curds) from the liquid whey. Sweet whey is the byproduct of rennet-coagulated cheese, and acid whey (also called sour whey) is the byproduct of acid-coagulated cheese. Sweet whey has a pH greater than or equal to 5.6; acid whey has a pH less than or equal to 5.1.

Whey is left over when milk is coagulated during the process of cheese production and contains everything that is soluble from milk after the pH is dropped to 4.6 during the coagulation process. It is a 5% solution of lactose in water, with some minerals and lactalbumin.  The fat is removed and then processed for human foods. Processing can be done by simple drying, or the relative protein content can be increased by removing lipids and other non-protein materials. For example, spray drying after membrane filtration separates the proteins from whey.

Whey can be denatured by heat. High heat (such as the sustained high temperatures above 72 °C associated with the pasteurization process) denatures whey proteins. While native whey protein does not aggregate upon renneting or acidification of milk, denaturing the whey protein triggers hydrophobic interactions with other proteins, and the formation of a protein gel. Heat-denatured whey can still cause allergies in some people.

Uses 
Whey is used to produce whey cheeses such as ricotta, brunost, and whey butter and many other products for human consumption. The fat content of whey is low; for example 1,000 pounds of whey are required to make a few pounds of whey butter. It is also an additive in many processed foods, including breads, crackers, and commercial pastry, and in animal feed. Whey proteins consist primarily of α-lactalbumin and β-lactoglobulin. Sweet whey contains glycomacropeptide (GMP). It is also an abundant source of lactose which can further be used for the synthesis of lactose-based bioactive molecules.

Dairy whey remaining from home-made cheesemaking has many uses.  It is a dough conditioner and can be substituted for skimmed milk in most baked good recipes that require milk (bread, pancakes, muffins, etc.).

Throughout history, whey was a popular drink in inns and coffee houses. When Joseph Priestley was at college at Daventry Academy, 1752–1755, he records that, on the morning of Wednesday, 22 May 1754, he "went with a large company to drink whey."  This was probably "sack whey" or "wine whey".

Whey is also one of the main ingredients of Rivella, a carbonated drink in Switzerland.

Another use of whey is to make "cream of tartar whey":  "Put a pint of blue milk [skim milk] over the fire, when it begins to boil, put in two tea spoonfuls of cream of tartar, then take it off the fire, and let it stand till the curd settles to the bottom of the pan, then put it into a basin to cool, and drink it milk warm.”(this is known as heat-acid coagulation)

In areas where cheese is made, excess whey byproduct is sometimes sprayed over hay fields as a fertilizer.

Historically whey, being a byproduct of cheese making, was considered a waste product and was pumped into rivers and streams in the U.S.  Since the whey contained protein, this practice led to the growth of large concentrations of algae.   These were deemed to be a hazard to the ecosystem because they prevented sunlight and oxygen from reaching the water.  The government eventually prohibited this practice which led to a disposal problem for producers of other dairy products. Their first solution was to use it as a cheap filler in the production of ice cream.  Whey eventually found its way into innumerable other products as a filler and ultimately into a number of health food products where it remains a popular supplement.

Whey protein 

Whey protein is commonly marketed as a dietary supplement, and various health claims have been attributed to it in the alternative medicine community.  Although whey proteins are responsible for some milk allergies, the major allergens in milk are the caseins.  It is sold as a nutritional supplement.

Whey is the primary ingredient in most protein powders, which are used primarily by athletes and bodybuilders to obtain the necessary amounts of protein for muscle building/maintenance on a daily basis. Whey protein has a high level of leucine, one of the three branched-chain amino acids, making it ideal for muscle growth and repair. Whey is pasteurized, just like any milk, to assure that no harmful bacteria are breeding in the liquid. Studies have shown that this process of using extreme temperatures eliminates 99.7% of bacteria without coagulating the protein into a solid mass. Next, the whey must be filtered, and so is loaded into a massive web of ceramic filters and stainless steel turbines. These machines work to separate out the lactose as well as the fats, leaving a liquid of 90% whey protein.

Hydrolysates are whey proteins that are predigested and partially hydrolyzed for the purpose of easier metabolizing, but their cost is generally higher.  Highly hydrolysed whey may be less allergenic than other forms of whey, due to the fact that the short chain peptides obtained by hydrolysis are less antigenic, because of the elimination of sequential epitopes.

Native whey protein is extracted from skim milk, not obtained as a byproduct of cheese production, and is produced as a concentrate and isolate.

Whey cream and butter

Cream can be skimmed from whey. Whey cream is saltier, tangier, and "cheesier" than ("sweet") cream skimmed from milk, and can be used to make whey butter. Due to the low fat content of whey the yield is not high, with typically two to five parts of butter manufactured from the whey of 1,000 parts milk. Whey cream and butter are suitable for making butter-flavoured food, as they have a stronger flavour of their own. They are also cheaper to manufacture than sweet cream and butter.

Health
Because whey contains lactose, it should be avoided by those who are lactose intolerant. When used as a food additive, whey can contribute to quantities of lactose far above the level of tolerance of most lactose-intolerant individuals.

Liquid whey contains lactose, vitamins, protein, and minerals, along with traces of fat.

In 2005 researchers at Lund University in Sweden found that whey can help regulate and reduce spikes in blood sugar levels in people with type 2 diabetes by increasing insulin secretion.

Dairy products produce higher insulin responses (Insulin index, II, 90–98) than expected from their comparatively low glycemic indices (GI 15–30). Insulinogenic effects from dairy products have been observed in healthy subjects, both when ingested as a single meal, and when included into a mixed meal. The insulin-releasing capacity of dairy products has been attributed to the protein fraction, particularly the whey fraction, and the subsequent release of amino acids during digestion has been proposed to underlie the insulinogenic properties of milk.

People can be allergic to whey or other milk proteins (an allergy not be confused with lactose intolerance). As whey proteins are altered by high temperatures, whey-sensitive people may be able to tolerate evaporated, boiled, or sterilized milk. Hard cheeses are high in casein, but low in whey proteins, and are the least allergenic for those allergic to whey proteins. However, casein proteins (which are heat-stable) are the most important allergens in cheese, and an individual may be allergic to either or both types of protein.

Unsupported health claims 

In 2010 a panel of the European Food Safety Authority examined health claims made for whey protein. For the following claims either no references were provided for the claimed effect or the provided studies did not test the claims, or reported conflicting results:
 Increase in satiety leading to a reduction in energy intake
 Contribution to the maintenance or achievement of a normal body weight
 Growth or maintenance of muscle mass (compared to other protein sources)
 Increase in lean body mass during energy restriction and resistance training (compared to other protein sources)
 Reduction of body fat mass during energy restriction and resistance training (compared to other protein sources)
 Increase in muscle strength (compared to other protein sources)
 Increase in endurance capacity during the subsequent exercise bout after strenuous exercise
 Skeletal muscle tissue repair (compared to other protein sources)
 Faster recovery from muscle fatigue after exercise (compared to other protein sources).
For the studies around muscle mass and strength whey protein was compared to other protein sources. This is important to note, since protein is necessary for building muscles and this study proved that whey protein is not better for building strength and size than other protein sources.

On the basis of the data presented, the 2010 panel concluded that a cause and effect relationship between the consumption of whey protein and these claims had not been established.

See also

 Buttermilk
 List of dairy products

References

External links
 Whey Protein: Waste Product of the Past is Nutritional Powerhouse of the Future

Dairy products
Milk
Cheese
By-products